The dorsal ulnocarpal ligament is a ligament in the hand.
It is a fibrous band passing from the styloid process of the ulna to the dorsal aspect of the carpal bones.

References

Ligaments of the upper limb